Lalitpur is a city and a municipal board in Lalitpur District, India in the Indian state of Uttar Pradesh. It is also district headquarters of Lalitpur district. The city is part of Bundelkhand region.

History
Lalitpur was Ruled By Bundela Rajputs. Raja Mardan Singh Bundela Great Warrior Fight Against Britishers.A Muslim family house in Lalitpur was the birthplace of Abdul Karim, the appointed munshi and royal servant.

Demographics
As per provisional data of 2011 census, Lalitpur had a population of 133,305, out of which males were 69,529 and females were 54,062. The literacy rate is 82.39% with male literacy being 89.12% and female literacy being 75.06%.

Out of the total population, Hinduism is practised by 76.27% people, Islam 13.72%, Jainism 8.99% and the rest 1.02% follow other faiths.

Block list of Lalitpur 
Block-Madawara
Block-Maharouni
Block-virdha
Block-Bar
Block-Tallbehat
Block-Jakhaura
The Block is established for state government.

Block list of Lalitpur district
Block Madawara-01/10/1962
Block Maharauni-01/07/1956
Block Virdha -01/04/1962
Block Bar-01/04/1961
Block Talbehat-01/04/1956
Block Jakhaura-28/01/1955

Tourism

Deogarh is a village in Lalitpur district of the Indian state of Uttar Pradesh. It is located on the right bank of Betwa River and to the west of Lalitpur hills. It is known for Gupta monuments and for many ancient monuments of Hindu and Jain origins inside and outside the walls of the fort.The Dashavatara Temple is an early 6th century Vishnu Hindu temple located at Deogarh, Uttar Pradesh which is 25 kilometers from Lalitpur, in the Betwa River valley in northern-central India. It has a simple, one cell square plan and is one of the earliest Hindu stone temples still surviving today. Built in the Gupta Period, the Dashavatara Temple at Deogarh shows the ornate Gupta style architecture. Neelkantheshwar Temple is an ancient temple of Lord Shiva is situated at Lalitpur which is famous for its beautiful architecture.

Transport

Railway

Lalitpur Junction has very good rail connections with major Indian cities including New Delhi, Mumbai, Chennai, Patna, Indore, Bhopal, Gwalior, Jabalpur, Ujjain, Saugor, Puri, Allahabad, Bengaluru, Damoh, Jhansi.
A new railway line connecting Lalitpur to Tikamgarh started in 2013.Now this line is extended up to Khajuraho. The nearest junctions are Jhansi Junction and Bina Junction in Madhya Pradesh.

The important trains such as the shatabdi express Malwa Express, Punjab Mail, Bhopal - Lucknow Express, Jabalpur - Jammu Tawi Express, Gondwana Express, Bhopal Express, Shatabdi Express, sachkhand express, shatabdi express, mahamana express, pathankot express, Pushpak Express, Kushinagar Express and many other trains stop at Lalitpur.

Road

The proposed North-south-Corridor of the Golden-Quadrilateral Highway project passes through lalitpur is completed. 
A village road named madawara road goes to madawara village

Air
Lalitpur is the only place in Bundelkhand Region having an Airstrip maintained by the Airport Authority of India. Considering the Govt of India's new scheme to operate subsidized flights to small towns the strip is likely to be converted into a small airport.

Education

The city has several schools and colleges. The schools are affiliated to ISC, ICSE, CBSE and uttar pradesh board. Some of them are as follows - 
1. St. Dominic Savio English medium and Hindi medium school
2. Rani Laxmibai Public school
3. Modern Public school 
4. kendriya vidyalay 
5. Navoday 
6. Sanskaar Valley academy 
7. Siddhi sagar academy 
8. Maheshwari academy 
9. Wisteria academy
10. Shri varni jain inter college 
11. P. N. Inter college 
12. GIC and GGIC.
13. Pahalvan Gurudeen public school CBSE board & up board
The colleges are affiliated to the Bundelkhand University (Jhansi) and Uttar Pradesh Rajarshi Tandon Open University (Allahabad). IGNOU also has a campus in Lalitpur.Some of them are as follows - 
1. Nehru Mahavidyalay
2. RMV College
3. Deepchand chaudhary
4.Pahalvan Gurudeen mahila mahavidyalay
5. Pahalvan Gurudeen prashikshan mahavidyalay
6.pahalvan Gurudeen vidhi mahavidyalay
7 . Pahalvan Gurudeen College of science and technology

References

 
Cities in Bundelkhand
Cities in Uttar Pradesh